Alexander Asseily is a British/Lebanese technology entrepreneur and investor, and co-founder of consumer electronics company Jawbone. He was CEO of the company until 2007, Executive Chairman until 2010 and Non-Executive Chairman until January 2015. His business interests in the field are extensive, and he holds executive roles with companies such as Chiaro Technology, Atomico Ventures and Azimo. Asseily was named the 33rd most influential person in Silicon Valley in 2013.

Early life and education 

Raised in Beirut, Lebanon and London, UK, Asseily was educated in England before moving to California to obtain a Bachelor of Science in product design in 1997 and a master's in mechanical engineering in 1998 from Stanford University.

Career 

In 1999, Asseily founded AliphCom, with Hosain Rahman to develop verbal communications technologies, that were based on ideas originating from his Stanford senior thesis, starting with noise suppression products. In 2002, the company won a contract with DARPA, the Pentagon’s research body, to look into ways for soldiers to communicate in adverse noise conditions. The product they developed was initially trademarked Noise-Assassin and it later became part of the Jawbone headset product range. 
In September 2004, the company released its first consumer product, followed by the Bluetooth Jawbone in 2006. In 2011, Aliph started operating as Jawbone, a company that had at the time secured more than $100 million in growth funding from the Mayfield Fund, Khosla Ventures, Sequoia Capital, Andreessen Horowitz, Yuri Milner and J.P. Morgan, among others. Asseily served as CEO of Jawbone until 2007 and as Chairman until 2015.

In 2011-2012, Asseily raised $14 million in seed financing to develop Equal Media. This included global media site State, which he co-founded with his brother Mark Asseily and which launched at TechCrunch Disrupt in September 2013. In 2011, he also invested in Lulu, a dating intelligence app marketed at college-age women.

Asseily co-founded Chiaro Technology with Tania Boler in 2013. The women’s health startup is best known for the pelvic floor exerciser Elvie, which is accompanied by an app to track progress. The product won the Best R&D Award at the AXA PPP Health Tech and You awards 2015 and was also the winner of the Red Dot Product Design Award in 2016. Asseily acts as an Advisor to Osper, having invested in the company (which provides pre-paid debit cards for children) in 2013. Asseily serves as an adviser at venture capital fund Conversion Capital LLC. Alongside other tech investors, Asseily  backed SmartUp, an app designed to aid start-ups. He is also an investor in the club and work space Second Home.

Asseily is also an Entrepreneur Partner at Atomico. Founded in 2006 by Skype co-founder, Niklas Zennström. Atomico invests in technology companies. He has been a member of Google’s Digital News Initiative Innovation Fund Council since 2015. He is also Non-Executive Chairman at Azimo, a money transfer business based in London.

Public speaking
 Young Global Leader United Kingdom Summit: Britain: A 21st Century Partner for Global Growth, 04/12/11
 Speaker at UN Global Summit on the Syrian Refugee Crisis
 Google Campus London talks, 03/04/2014
 Tedx Brussels: Ingredients for Cultural Explosions, 2014 
 Sages and Scientists 2013
 Fast Growth Icons 2016 - keynote

Other interests
Asseily produced two documentaries pertaining to conflict in the Middle East and acted as executive producer for feature-length documentary Aluna. The film centers around the ancient Kogi tribe of Colombia, who emerge from their native land to warn the rest of the world about environmental dangers and how to address them. The film was released in June 2012. He also produced the short film  Two Men, One War, 33 Years On, which was broadcast on CNN, about two Lebanese civil war fighters reconciling with their past.

References

Stanford University School of Engineering alumni
Businesspeople from Beirut
British technology company founders
Living people
Businesspeople from London
Businesspeople in electronics
Year of birth missing (living people)